María José Cáceres Morales (born 11 June 1996) is a Peruvian footballer who plays as a right back for Club Universitario de Deportes and the Peru women's national team.

International career
Cáceres represented Peru at two South American U-20 Women's Championship editions (2014 South American U-20 Women's Championship and 2015). At senior level, she was part of the squad at the 2014 Copa América Femenina, but did not play. She appeared in a 0–12 friendly loss to Chile in 2017.
played Copa Libertadores twice.
Club Real Maracaná in Brazil 2014 and with the Universitario de Deportes in Paraguay 2017.
At present he championed with Universitario de Deportes having an undefeated championship in the F League of Peru.

References

1996 births
Living people
Women's association football fullbacks
Women's association football midfielders
Women's association football forwards
Peruvian women's footballers
Peru women's international footballers
Club Universitario de Deportes footballers